The Estadio Samuel León Brindis is a stadium in Tuxtla Gutiérrez, Chiapas, Mexico, used primarily for American football.

References 

College American football venues in Mexico
Samuel Leon Brindis